The Holocaust Memorial Day and Genocide Remembrance Act is a law passed in the Alberta Legislature with unanimous consent of all parties in November 2000. This law provides recognition for Yom HaShoah (Holocaust Memorial Day) that falls in April/May according to the Jewish lunar calendar. This act will signal a free day from all school and work for the day.

Holocaust remembrance days
Jews and Judaism in Alberta
2000 in Canadian law
Alberta law
Observances in Canada
2001 establishments in Alberta